Ertuğrul Özkan (born 23 October 1942) is a Turkish sailor. He competed in the Tornado event at the 1984 Summer Olympics, finishing last of 20 competitors.

References

External links
 

1942 births
Living people
Turkish male sailors (sport)
Olympic sailors of Turkey
Sailors at the 1984 Summer Olympics – Tornado
Place of birth missing (living people)